Hit the Lights (India Tour Edition) is a compilation album by British R&B singer Jay Sean. The album was released in India on 12 August 2011, by Universal Music India. The album features guest appearances from Nicki Minaj, Lil Wayne, Sean Paul, Lil Jon and Craig David.

Track listing
 "Hit the Lights" (featuring Lil Wayne)
 "2012 (It Ain't the End)" (featuring Nicki Minaj)
 "Cry"
 "Where Do We Go"
 "Down" (featuring Lil Wayne)
 "Do You Remember" (featuring Sean Paul & Lil Jon)
 "War (New Version)"
 "If I Ain't Got You"
 "Do You"
 "All or Nothing"
 "Stuck in the Middle" (featuring Craig David)
 "Hit the Lights (7th Heaven Radio Remix)" (featuring Lil Wayne)
 "Hit the Lights (Club Junkies Radio Remix)" (featuring Lil Wayne)

References

2011 compilation albums
Jay Sean albums
Cash Money Records compilation albums